{{DISPLAYTITLE:C25H32N2O}}
The molecular formula C25H32N2O (molar mass: 376.53 g/mol, exact mass: 376.2515 u) may refer to:

 3-Allylfentanyl
 Cyclopentylfentanyl
 Cysmethynil

Molecular formulas